Michigan Territory's at-large congressional district is an obsolete congressional district that encompassed the area of the Michigan Territory prior to admitting Michigan to the Union.  The territory was established on June 30, 1805, from Indiana Territory.  In 1819, the territory was given the authority to elect a congressional delegate until statehood in 1837.

List of delegates representing the district

See also
 Northwest Territory's at-large congressional district
 Illinois Territory's at-large congressional district
 Indiana Territory's at-large congressional district
 Wisconsin Territory's at-large congressional district
 Minnesota Territory's at-large congressional district

Notes

References 
 
 

At-large United States congressional districts
Territory At-large
Former congressional districts of the United States
1819 establishments in Michigan Territory
Constituencies established in 1819
1837 disestablishments in Michigan Territory
Constituencies disestablished in 1837